Llanegwad is a community located in Carmarthenshire, Wales. The population taken at the 2011 census was 1,473.

Llanegwad is built up mainly of small farms and detached homes. The community is bordered by the communities of: Llanfihangel Rhos-y-Corn; Llanfynydd; Llangathen; Llanarthney; Abergwili; and Llanllawddog, all being in Carmarthenshire. Villages include Cwrt Henri, Nantgaredig, and Pontargothi.

Services

Most of all homes located in Llanegwad are older Victorian properties, as well as a number of more modern homes. The area has few amenities any more.The village has lost much of the services it once had, an example being Llanegwad School; formerly "Llanegwad National School" closing down in 1948. The area over the years has also lost its drinking establishments.

Churches

The village  “Llanegwad Church" named for Saint Egwad is an historic church as it is the only remaining building on the site where several monasteries and religious cells once existed. The building was begun in the 10th–11th century but restored in the 19th century.

Holy Trinity Church was built in 1865 of local sandstone with a Gothic style bell tower, stained glass windows, wooden barrel vault nave, decorated interior with 25 frescoes. Benjamin Bucknall was the architect.

Coffee House
One of the more notable homes of Llanegwad is Ty Dderwen formerly Coffee House. The home of the Lewis family, the house received the name coffee when the church asked the Lewis family if they would be willing on a Sunday to serve coffee in their front room for the ladies after church. The house later served as a tailoring firm led by the master tailor David Lewis. The house at the same time served as the village post office. The house continued to stay in the same family lived in by David Eric Hart a musician and composer until he sold the house in the 1970s. The house is located next to Llanegwad church.

Governance
An electoral ward with the same name exists. This ward stretches north from Llanegwad and has a total population of 2,440.

References

Communities in Carmarthenshire
Villages in Carmarthenshire